Diwigdi ("Diwi") Valiente is an indigenous climate activist from the Guna people in Panama. He communicates the story of the effects of climate change and sea level rise on the community, who mostly live on coastal islands in Guna Yala. He founded the organization "Burwigan" which means "children" in Kuna to advocate for the community and bring artists to document the effects on the community. He also is an advocate for sustainable tourism, and opened a hostel in 2018 with a business partner Allen Lim.

He was profiled in El País in 2019. La Prensa named him one of the top 10 future leaders of Panama in 2020.

Personal life 
He is the son of Aresio Valiente López, an environmental lawyer. He was raised mostly in Panama City.

References 

Living people
Year of birth missing (living people)
Panamanian activists
Sustainable tourism